Miss Chitwan is a beauty pageant which began in 1994 for the girls of Central Development Region. Miss Chitwan has been organized by Bright Nepal since the start and has been paving the way to the field of professional modelling and direct entry to the national beauty pageants like Miss Nepal.

History
The pageant has been run by Bright Nepal. Anupa Giri was crowned as the first Miss Chitwan 1994, and ended up as third runner-up in the Miss Chitwanl 1994 beauty pageant.

Only Shristi Shrestha has clinched the Miss Nepal crown in 2012, so far being the only Miss Chitwan to win the crown of Miss Nepal. Miss Chitwan has the third highest number of placements after Miss Kathmandu and Miss Pokhara in Miss Nepal pageant and is ranked third-highest among regional contests in terms of placements.

Miss Chitwan 2070
After 12 years, the 3rd edition of Miss Chitwan 2070 was held on October 28, 2013, at the City hall. A total of 28 contestants were vying for the crown of Miss Chitwan 2071, Sitoshna Ban from Tandi won the title with Pooja Shrestha and Rakshya Thapa won the 1st and 2nd runners-up respectively.

Results summary
 Miss Nepal: Shristi Shrestha (2012)
 1st Runner-up: Anupama Aura Gurung (2011)
 2nd Runners-up: Sarina Maskey (2011), Chandani Shrestha (1997)
 3rd Runner-up: Bindu KC (1994)
 Top 10: Sitoshna Ban (2014)

Awards
 Miss Personality: Chandani Shrestha (1997)
 Miss Photogenic: Sitoshna Ban (2014)
 Miss Confidence: Shristi Shrestha (2012)
 Miss Best Hair: Anupama Aura Gurung (2011)

Performance in Miss Nepal
From 1998 till 2013 there was no Miss Chitwan beauty pageant; however, one or two delegates were sent to Miss Nepal contest as the representative of Chitwan District.

References

External links
 Official Website
 Pageant
 Official Facebook Page 

Beauty pageants in Nepal
Nepalese awards
Miss Nepal regional pageants
Recurring events established in 1994
1994 establishments in Nepal